John Henry Layton (born 29 June 1951) is a former English footballer and coach who spent much of his career at Hereford United, both as a player and a manager. He played centre back.

Layton was manager of Hereford United during the 1994−95 Football League Third Division season. Between 1999 and 2002, Layton managed in Pakistan, including a stint as coach of the Pakistani national team.

References

1951 births
Living people
English footballers
English football managers
Hereford United F.C. players
Newport County A.F.C. players
Gloucester City A.F.C. players
Hereford United F.C. managers
Pakistan national football team managers
Kidderminster Harriers F.C. players
Expatriate football managers in the Maldives
British bricklayers
Expatriate football managers in Pakistan
English expatriate sportspeople in Pakistan
Association football defenders